Radical 8 or radical lid, whose meaning as an independent word is unknown, but is often interpreted to be a "lid" when used as a radical, is radical 23 of the 214 Kangxi radicals and consists of two strokes.
 
In the Kangxi Dictionary, there are 38 characters (out of 49,030) to be found under this radical.

 is also the 17th indexing component in the Table of Indexing Chinese Character Components predominantly adopted by Simplified Chinese dictionaries published in mainland China.

Evolution

Derived characters

Variant forms
There is a difference in Japanese and Chinese in printing typefaces for this radical. Traditionally, a short vertical line on top of the horizontal line was used in printing, while a slanted dash is preferred in handwriting.

The vertical dot form is used in the Kangxi Dictionary, modern Japanese and Korean typefaces. In Mainland China, Taiwan, and Hong Kong, a slanted dot on top of the horizontal line is the standard form, though the traditional form with a vertical dot is also widely used in Traditional Chinese typefaces and in some cases Simplified Chinese typefaces.

Both forms are acceptable in handwriting in each language.

Literature 

Leyi Li: "Tracing the Roots of Chinese Characters: 500 Cases". Beijing 1993,

External links

Unihan Database - U+4EA0

008
017